The 2007–08 Lebanese Women's Football League was the 1st edition of the Lebanese Women's Football League. Sadaka won the competition's first title, with a 2–1 victory over Ansar in the final matchday of the season.

League table

See also
2007–08 Lebanese Women's FA Cup

References

External links
RSSSF.com

Lebanese Women's Football League seasons
W1
2007–08 domestic women's association football leagues